S Virginis is a Mira-type variable star in the constellation Virgo. Located approximately  distant, it varies between magnitudes 6.3 and 13.2 over a period of approximately 375 days.

References

Mira variables
Virgo (constellation)
M-type giants
Virginis, S
5101
117833
066100
Durchmusterung objects